Anaphe stellata is a species of moth in the family Notodontidae. It was described by Félix Édouard Guérin-Méneville in 1844. It is found in Ethiopia, Madagascar and Senegal.

References

Natural History Museum Lepidoptera generic names catalog

Notodontidae
Moths described in 1844
Moths of Africa